Ebisu, also transliterated Yebisu, may refer to:

 Ebisu (mythology), a god of Japanese mythology
 Ebisu, Shibuya, a neighborhood in Tokyo, Japan
 Ebisu Station (Tokyo), a train station located in Tokyo's Shibuya ward, Japan
 Ebisu Station (Hyogo), a train station located in Miki, Hyogo, Japan
 Yebisu, a brand of Japanese beer
 Ebisu Circuit, a motorsport circuit in Fukushima Prefecture, Japan
 Evisu, Japanese jeans brand
 Ebisu, an alternate pronunciation of the Emishi people who lived in northeastern Honshū, Japan
 Ebisu, a character from the manga and anime series Naruto; see List of Naruto characters

People with the surname
 Etsunobu Ebisu, Japanese video game producer
, Japanese baseball player
 , Japanese manga artist and actor

Japanese-language surnames